Syzeuctus is a genus of parasitoid wasps belonging to the family Ichneumonidae.

The genus has cosmopolitan distribution.

Species:
 Syzeuctus abonis Ugalde & Gauld, 2002 
 Syzeuctus aequatorialis Benoit, 1959

References

Ichneumonidae
Ichneumonidae genera